Masayoshi Ochiai (3 June 1910 – December 1939) was a Japanese track and field athlete. He competed in the men's hammer throw at the 1932 Summer Olympics. He was killed in action during World War II.

References

External links
 

1910 births
1939 deaths
Sportspeople from Shimane Prefecture
Japanese male hammer throwers
Olympic male hammer throwers
Olympic athletes of Japan
Athletes (track and field) at the 1932 Summer Olympics
Japanese military personnel killed in World War II
Japan Championships in Athletics winners
20th-century Japanese people